Foyle is a surname. It may refer to:

 Adonal Foyle (born 1975), Vincentian-American basketball player
 Ashley Foyle (born 1986), English footballer
 Charles Henry Foyle (died 1948), English businessperson; inventor of the folding carton
 Christina Foyle (1911–1999), English bookseller
 Jonathan Foyle (born ?), English architectural historian and television broadcaster
 Kevin Foyle (born 1962), English cricketer
 Martin Foyle (born 1963), English footballer and manager
 Mike Foyle (born 1985), British music composer and producer
 Neil Foyle (born 1991), Irish hurler
 Órfhlaith Foyle (born ?), Irish writer and poet
 Samantha Foyle (born 1988), Australian squash player
 William Foyle (1885–1963), British bookseller

In fiction
 Anthony "Tony" Foyle, Viscount Gillingham, a character in Downton Abbey
 Christopher Foyle, protagonist of the British television detective series Foyle's War
 Gully Foyle, protagonist of The Stars My Destination by Alfred Bester
 Kitty Foyle (disambiguation)

See also
 Foyle (disambiguation)